Events from the year 1735 in France.

Incumbents 
Monarch: Louis XV

Events
 Quebec: Construction begins on the Chemin du roy between Quebec and Montreal.
 Niderviller pottery established.

Births
 27 January – Étienne Clavière, financier and politician (d. 1793)
 28 February – Alexandre-Théophile Vandermonde musician and chemist (d. 1796)
 31 December – J. Hector St. John de Crèvecœur, writer on America (d. 1813)

Deaths

See also

References

1730s in France